Goniographa discussa is a moth of the family Noctuidae. It is found from the Zeravshan Mountains and Hissar Mountains through the western Pamirs to north-eastern Afghanistan (Badakhshan).

The wingspan is 30–35 mm.

External links
A Revision of the Palaearctic species of the Eugraphe (Hübner, 1821-1816) Generic complex. Parti. The genera Eugraphe and Goniographa (Lepidoptera, Noctuidae)

Noctuinae
Moths described in 2002